Brook Staples (born 23 June 1966) is an Australian equestrian. He placed 18th in individual eventing at the 2000 Summer Olympics. In England, he won the EHOA Martin Collins British Novice Championship and the 2008 Dodson & Horrell Novice Championship. In 2003, he helped steal a horse he had rode, Master Monarch, from Andrew Hoy.

References

External links
 

1966 births
Living people
Australian male equestrians
Olympic equestrians of Australia
Equestrians at the 2000 Summer Olympics
People from Mudgee
Sportsmen from New South Wales